Dazz Newsome (born May 15, 1999) is an American football wide receiver for the San Francisco 49ers of the National Football League (NFL). He played college football at North Carolina and was drafted by the Chicago Bears in the sixth round of the 2021 NFL Draft.

Early years
Newsome attended Hampton High School in Hampton, Virginia. He played wide receiver, running back and cornerback in high school. As a senior he was the Daily Press Offensive Player of the Year after he had 35 total touchdowns, 1,684 rushing yards and 413 receiving yards. He originally committed to the University of Maryland, College Park to play college football but later changed to the University of North Carolina at Chapel Hill.

College career
Newsome originally started his career at North Carolina in 2017 as a defensive back but was converted to wide receiver. He finished his first season with 18 receptions for 227 yards in nine games. As a sophomore in 2018, he played in 11 games with six starts and had 44 receptions for 506 yards and two receiving touchdowns and a punt return touchdown. As a junior in 2019, Newsome led the team with 72 receptions for 1,018 yards and 10 touchdowns. In his senior year, the COVID-19 affected 2020 season, Newsome caught 54 passes for 684 yards and 6 touchdowns. He entered the NFL draft following the season, electing not to use the extra year of eligibility that had been granted to NCAA athletes in response to the pandemic.

Professional career

Chicago Bears
Newsome was drafted by the Chicago Bears in the 6th round, 221st overall, of the 2021 NFL Draft. On June 2, 2021, Newsome suffered a broken collarbone. The same day, he signed his four-year rookie contract with Chicago. On August 31, 2021, Newsome was waived by the Chicago Bears.  The following day, Newsome was added to Chicago's practice squad.  He was promoted to the active roster on January 8, 2022.

On August 23, 2022, Newsome was waived by the Bears.

The Seattle Seahawks hosted Newsome for a workout on October 18, 2022. On October 29, 2022, the Cincinnati Bengals also hosted Newsome for a workout.

Kansas City Chiefs
On November 1, 2022, the Kansas City Chiefs signed Newsome to their practice squad. He was released just two days later.

San Francisco 49ers
On November 14, 2022, the San Francisco 49ers hosted Newsome for a workout. He was signed to the team’s practice squad the following day. He signed a reserve/future contract on January 31, 2023.

References

External links
North Carolina Tar Heels bio

1999 births
Living people
Chicago Bears players
Sportspeople from Hampton, Virginia
Players of American football from Virginia
American football wide receivers
Hampton High School (Virginia) alumni
North Carolina Tar Heels football players
Kansas City Chiefs players
San Francisco 49ers players